The Stockmore Ranger Station, is a ranger station in Ashley National Forest in Duchesne County, Utah, United States, near Tabiona, that is listed on the National Register of Historic Places (NRHP).

Description
It was a work of U.S. Forest Service architects. It was listed on the NRHP) in 1999; the listing included five contributing buildings and five non-contributing buildings and structures, built from c.1914 to 1985.

It is significant as a memento of the early days of the U.S. Forest Service, which had been established in 1905. The station established a Federal presence and its main building is one of the "earliest remaining structures on the Ashley National Forest built specifically by the Forest Service to house a ranger."  It is named for the former town of Stockmore, about 1/4 mile to the east, which had been abandoned around 1906 after it was discovered that supposed gold strike in the area had been a fraud.

See also

 National Register of Historic Places listings in Duchesne County, Utah
 Indian Canyon Ranger Station, also NRHP-listed in Duchesne County

References

External links

Park buildings and structures on the National Register of Historic Places in Utah
Government buildings completed in 1914
Buildings and structures in Duchesne County, Utah
United States Forest Service ranger stations
National Register of Historic Places in Duchesne County, Utah
1914 establishments in Utah